Honduras competed at the 2011 World Aquatics Championships in Shanghai, China between July 16 and 31, 2011.

Swimming

Honduras qualified 4 swimmers.

Men

Women

References

Nations at the 2011 World Aquatics Championships
2011 in Honduran sport
Honduras at the World Aquatics Championships